Lieutenant-General Sir Willoughby Garnons Gwatkin,  (11 August 1859 – 2 February 1925) was a British Army officer who served as Chief of the General Staff of the Canadian Militia during the First World War.

Military career
The son of a barrister, Gwatkin was born in Twickenham, Middlesex, and was educated at Shrewsbury School, then at King's College, Cambridge. He later went to the Royal Military College, Sandhurst. He was commissioned into the Manchester Regiment as a lieutenant on 10 May 1882, and promoted to captain on 17 January 1890. He served as staff captain at headquarters when in January 1900 he was appointed a deputy assistant adjutant-general, followed by promotion to major on 7 April 1900. During the next year he returned as staff captain, until in October 1902 when he was appointed deputy assistant quartermaster-general. In 1905 he was posted to Canada as a staff officer and in 1907 he returned to Britain to attend Staff College and was promoted colonel. In July 1913 he was appointed Chief Staff Officer, Canada, the first to be appointed by the Dominion Government instead of by the British War Office. In 1916 he was given the temporary rank of major-general. He retired from the Army in 1920 and was allowed to retain the honorary rank of major-general. He then served as Inspector-General of the Canadian Air Force until 1922 with the rank of air vice-marshal. In this role he provided advice and guidance to Air Commodore Arthur Tylee, Air Officer Commanding the Canadian Air Force. In 1922 Gwatkin was promoted honorary lieutenant-general in the Canadian Militia Reserve of Officers.

Gwatkin was appointed Companion of the Order of the Bath (CB) in 1916, Companion of the Order of St Michael and St George (CMG) in 1918, and Knight Commander of the Order of St Michael and St George (KCMG) in January 1920. In July 1924 he was appointed honorary colonel of the Manchester Regiment, dying six months later at the age of 65.

Footnotes

References
 Obituary, The Times, 4 February 1925
 Appreciation, Montreal Gazette, 25 March 1922

External links
 
 

1859 births
1925 deaths
People from Twickenham
People educated at Shrewsbury School
Alumni of King's College, Cambridge
Graduates of the Royal Military College, Sandhurst
Manchester Regiment officers
English emigrants to Canada
British Army generals of World War I
Commanders of the Canadian Army
Canadian generals
Royal Canadian Air Force air marshals
Canadian military personnel of World War I
Military personnel from Middlesex
Knights Commander of the Order of St Michael and St George
Companions of the Order of the Bath
Graduates of the Staff College, Camberley